Lisa Marie Eilbacher (born May 5, 1956) is a retired American actress.

Early life
Lisa Marie Eilbacher was born in Dhahran, Saudi Arabia, the daughter of an American oil company executive. She was raised in France. Her two siblings are also actors; sister Cindy Eilbacher is best known for portraying Jerry Van Dyke's daughter on the series My Mother the Car and played the character "Betty Wilkens" on Happy Days (episode "The Lemon"), and brother Bobby Eilbacher portrayed "Mike Horton" on the soap opera Days of Our Lives.

Career
Eilbacher started acting as a child, appearing on such shows as My Three Sons and Gunsmoke. She later made a transition into adult roles on such shows as The Amazing Spider-Man. Eilbacher is best known for her roles in two 1980s films: An Officer and a Gentleman and Beverly Hills Cop. In An Officer and a Gentleman, she played Naval Aviation Officer Candidate Casey Seeger, a popular and charming woman who nearly flunked out of the program due to her inability to complete the obstacle course; however, she persevered and graduated. An amateur bodybuilder in real life, Eilbacher said the hardest aspect of this role was "pretending" to be out of shape. In Beverly Hills Cop, she played Jenny Summers, a childhood friend of Eddie Murphy's character who reunited with him to solve the murder of a mutual friend.

Eilbacher was also featured in the 1983 miniseries The Winds of War, playing Madeleine Henry. Eilbacher starred as Callie Shaw in The Hardy Boys Mysteries in 1977. The same year she appeared in the episode "The Innocent" of the short-lived Logan's Run TV series. She also guest starred on the TV series Man from Atlantis in an episode where she played Shakespeare's Juliet. She also appeared in the 1974 television movie Bad Ronald, 1981's This House Possessed, and several other theatrical and television films and episodes of television series. This House Possessed reunited her with Parker Stevenson, with whom she had worked on The Hardy Boys Mysteries.

Filmography

Film

Television

References

External links

1956 births
20th-century American actresses
American child actresses
American expatriates in France
American expatriates in Saudi Arabia
American film actresses
American television actresses
Living people
People from Dhahran
21st-century American women